Mohammad Dookun (born 20 July 1993) is a Mauritian long-distance runner. In 2019, he competed in the senior men's race at the 2019 IAAF World Cross Country Championships held in Aarhus, Denmark. He finished in 119th place.

In 2016, he competed in the men's 800 metres and men's 1500 metres events at the 2016 African Championships in Athletics held in Durban, South Africa. 

In 2018, he represented Mauritius at the 2018 Commonwealth Games held in Gold Coast, Australia. He competed in the men's 1500 metres event. He did not qualify to compete in the final.

References

External links 
 

Living people
1993 births
Mauritian people of Indian descent
Place of birth missing (living people)
Mauritian male long-distance runners
Mauritian male cross country runners
Commonwealth Games competitors for Mauritius
Athletes (track and field) at the 2018 Commonwealth Games
People from Plaines Wilhems District